Hephzibah or  Hepzibah ( or) is a minor figure in the Books of Kings in the Bible. She was the wife of Hezekiah, King of Judah (reigned  715 and 686 BCE), and the mother of Manasseh of Judah (reigned  687–643 BCE).

Biblical and rabbinic accounts
According to Rabbinic literature, Isaiah was the maternal grandfather of Manasseh.

Symbolic name
The name Hephzibah is also used as a symbolic name for Zion following its restoration to the favor of Yahweh in Isaiah 62:4.

See also
 Isaiah 62

References

External links 
 

8th-century BCE Hebrew people
7th-century BCE Jews
8th-century BC women
Jewish royalty
7th-century BC women
Book of Isaiah people
Books of Kings people
Davidic line
Queens consort of Israel and Judah
Women in the Hebrew Bible
Hezekiah